Roger Lynn Thompson (born ) is a Republican member of the Oklahoma State Senate, representing the 8th district. He was initially elected in November 2014. He is the president of the News Leader Company, Inc., which owns the Okemah News Leader, in Okemah, Oklahoma.

References

Republican Party Oklahoma state senators
Living people
People from Okemah, Oklahoma
1950s births
21st-century American politicians